{{Infobox person
|name        = Christian Eduard Boettcher 
|image       = File:Die Gartenlaube (1871) b 717.jpg
|caption     = Christian Eduard Boettcher 1871
|birth_date = 
|birth_place = Imgenbroich
|death_date = 
|death_place = Düsseldorf
|other_names = 
|known_for   = 
|occupation = painter
|nationality = German 
}}Christian Eduard Boettcher, or Böttcher' ( 9 December 1818 in Imgenbroich – 15 June 1889 in Düsseldorf), was a German painter whose work comprised portraiture and genre painting.

Career

Boettcher first attended the State Academy of Fine Arts Stuttgart under Johann Heinrich von Dannecker from 1833 to 1838 and trained as a lithographer, working as such for the Ebner'sche Verlagshaus (Ebner's publishing house), in Stuttgart and for the Arnz & Comp. lithographic institute in Düsseldorf.

From 1844 to 1849 he studied at the Düsseldorf Art Academy under the history painter Theodor Hildebrandt and in the master class of Friedrich Wilhelm von Schadow. After completing his studies, he settled in Düsseldorf. In 1848 he was one of the founding members of the Malkasten artists' association, of which he was a member of the board for a time. He was a member of the Verein der Düsseldorfer Künstler (Association of Düsseldorf Artists), and the academic association, Orient. Boettcher was appointed professor at the Düsseldorf and Academy of Arts in 1872.

 Artistic activity

In his work Boettcher concentrated primarily on figurative paintings, initially preferring - under the influence of landscape painter Carl Wilhelm Hübner - socially critical themes, for example with the paintings Der Blinde und sein Führer (1845) and Die Entlassung des Gefangenen (1848). In the 1860s and 70s, he produced paintings that combine the depiction of people, towns and landscapes on the Rhine between Bingen and Cologne, and whose subjects are occasionally in the tradition of painter and graphic artist Adolph Schroedter. Deviating from the latter's often satirical and critical approach, however, Boettcher's popular compositions emphasise a late Romantic sentimental mood, for example in Haymaking on the Rhine (1856) as well as Evening on the Rhine (1860) and Summer Night on the Rhine (1862) both of which show identifiable Düsseldorf artists in front of an inn, and  Rhenish Harvest near Sinzig (1864). Further paintings include The Tourist on the Rhine (1865), presumably showing the painter Adolf Seel, Country House on the Rhine (1866), Excerpt for the Grape Harvest (1867), At the Market Fountain of a Rhenish Town (1870), and Rhine Journey at the Loreley (1880).

Boettcher as portrait painter and draughtsman is depicted, among others, within portrait drawings of the painters Carl Gottfried Eybe and Hermann Werner. His own portrait was painted by Ernst Bosch, and another by Adolf Line, and also a caricature, are held by the Malkasten artists' association in Düsseldorf.

Lithographs after his works were published in the Düsseldorfer Künstleralben (Düsseldorf Artists' Albums) and in the Sammlung von Lithographien nach Genrebildern Düsseldorfer Künstler (Collection of lithographs after genre paintings by Düsseldorf artists), with his wood engravings in many illustrated sheets of the time.

 Significant worksHeinrich Ed. Anschütz als Marquis Posa in Schillers ‚Don Carlos‘ (1840): Munich, TheatermuseumDer Blinde und sein Führer (1845)Portrait of Amalie Wolff, spätere Frau von Benkraths (1847): Krefeld, Kaiser Wilhelm MuseumEntlassung eines Gefangenen (1848)Portrait of Frau Wilhelm Beissel (1849)Nach der Schlacht (1851)Heimkehr vom Schulfest / Maitag (1852): Bonn, Rheinisches LandesmuseumDer strafende Schuhmacher (1853)Portrait of Mathilde Mollier, geb. von Franqué (1853)Sommerabend am Rhein (1855)Heuernte an der Lahn (1856)Kinderkonzert (1857)Abend am Rhein (1860)Rheinische Ernte (1861)Herbstabend (1861)Sommernacht am Rhein (1862): Cologne, Wallraf–Richartz MuseumAbend im Schwarzwald (1863): Leipzig, KunstmuseumRheinische Dorfjugend (1863)Sommermorgen am Rhein (1864)Auf der Wanderschaft (1865)Auszug zur Weinlese (1866)Glückliche Menschen in der Hütte und Glückliche Menschen im Palast (1866)Am Marktbrunnen einer rheinischen Stadt (1870)Landhaus am Rhein (1870)Heimkehr vom Feld (1872)Rheinischer Schieferdecker (1874)Sonntag am Rhein (1875)Blick auf Burg Katz und die Loreley (1876): Bonn, Sammlung Rheinromantik (Rhine Romanticism Collection)Mutterglück (1877)Blick von Muffendorf bei Bonn auf das Siebengebirge (1877): Bonn, Sammlung RheinromantikÜberfahrt an der Loreley (1880): Bonn, Sammlung RheinromantikDer Rhein bei Rolandseck (1882): Bonn, Sammlung RheinromantikDes Köhlers Abendgebet (1884)Oberwesel mit Schönburg (1884): Bonn, Rheinisches LandesmuseumOberwesel (1888): Bonn, Sammlung RheinromantikSt. Goar und Goarshausen am Rhein (1885)Dausenau bei Ems (1887)Leutesdorf mit Andernach am Rhein (1888)Portrait of Frl. Bertha von Stadman, the Besselich house in VallendarPortrait of Leonhard Rausch, Düsseldorf, Malkasten Artists' AssociationPortrait of August Beck, Düsseldorf, Malkasten Artists' AssociationPortrait of Bünker, Düsseldorf, Malkasten Artists' AssociationPortrait of Theodor MintropPortrait of Josef Gotthard Lossen (1795–1866), Portrait of Maria Anna Lossen, born Cathrein (1806–1887) and Portrait of Maximilian LossenFurther reading and sources
 Daelen, Eduard; "Böttcher, Christian Eduard" in Allgemeine Deutsche Biographie (ADB), vol 47, p. 142, Duncker & Humblot, Leipzig 1903.
 Die Künstler aller Zeiten und Völker; vol 1, Stuttgart 1857, Friedrich Müller (ed.)
 Von Boetticher, Friedrich (art historian); Malerwerke des 19. Jahrhunderts. Beitrag zur Kunstgeschichte vol I, 2, Dresden 1891–1901.
 Vollmer, Hans (art historian); Boettcher, Christian Eduard, (ed.) Felix Becker, vol 4, p. 210, Thieme-Becker
 Allgemeines Künstlerlexikon. Leben und Werke der berühmtesten bildenden Künstler; vol 1, Hermann Alexander Müller (compiled), Hans Wolfgang Singer (ed.), Literarische Anstalt Rütten & Loening, Frankfurt (1921)
 Rosenberg, Adolf; Aus der Düsseldorfer Malerschule. Studien und Skizzen. Leipzig 1889, p. 36.
 Schaarschmidt, Friedrich; Zur Geschichte der Düsseldorfer Kunst insbesondere im XIX. Jahrhundert, p. 179, Düsseldorf 1902
 Rheinische Malerei in der Biedermeierzeit; p. 89, Karl Koetschau (ed.), Düsseldorf 1926
 Hundert Jahre Künstlerverein Malkasten Düsseldorf 1848–1948; p. 19, Düsseldorf 1948
 Immel, Ute; Die deutsche Genremalerei im 19. Jahrhundert; Heidelberg University (dissertation) 1967, p. 288
 Hütt, Wolfgang; Die Düsseldorfer Malerschule. 1819–1869, Leipzig 1995
 Quellen zur Geschichte des Künstlervereins Malkasten. Ein Zentrum bürgerlicher Kunst und Kultur in Düsseldorf seit 1848, Sabine Schroyen (ed.), Cologne 1992.
 Meisterwerke der Düsseldorfer Malerschule, Hans Paffrath (ed.), Düsseldorf 1995
 Michael, Meinhard; "Boettcher, Christian Eduard" in Die Bildenden Künstler aller Zeiten und Völker (The visual artists of all times and peoples),  vol. 12, Allgemeines Künstlerlexikon, Saur, Munich 1995
 Lexikon der Düsseldorfer Malerschule 1819–1918, vol 1, pp. 154–158, Hans Paffrath (ed.), Kunstmuseum Düsseldorf im Ehrenhof and Galerie Paffrath, Bruckmann, Munich 1997, 
 Weiß, Siegfried (art historian); "Christian Eduard Böttcher – Rheinromantik mit Düsseldorfer Malern", in Weltkunst'', Issue 1, 1. January 1998

External links

1818 births
1889 deaths
19th-century German painters
19th-century German male artists
People from Aachen (district)
Artists from North Rhine-Westphalia